Cherry Township is the name of some places in the U.S. state of Pennsylvania:
Cherry Township, Butler County, Pennsylvania
Cherry Township, Sullivan County, Pennsylvania

Pennsylvania township disambiguation pages